The Tahitian Terrace was a Polynesian themed restaurant at Disneyland. The restaurant opened in June 1962, located just inside the Adventureland gates. It was Disneyland's first dinner theater, with entertainment provided by the Polynesian Revue, a music-and-dance show featuring dance troupe the Royal Tahitians, hula dancers and a fire walker. The restaurant was originally sponsored by Stouffer's frozen food; in the 1980s, Kikkoman was the sponsor.

The restaurant was actually the back half of the hub's Plaza Pavilion restaurant, which originally had a Hawaiian-themed patio that looked out over the Jungle Cruise waterway. The same kitchen was used for both the Plaza Pavilion and the Tahitian Terrace.

Served at outdoor tables, guests could sample exotic South Seas foods, including "sizzling teriyaki steak, savory shrimp tempura, fried almonds in rich egg batter, and raisin ice cream topped with flaming caramel sauce." The signature drink was the non-alcoholic Planter's Punch, served in a tall frosted glass with faux flower garnish. In 1962, a full dinner, including drink and dessert, cost under $4 ($ in  dollars ). Guests at the restaurant were given free leis.

The back of the menu described the show: 

Disneyland's horticulturalist, Morgan "Bill" Evans, intended to use an African coral tree as the central feature in the dining patio, but Walt Disney said it wasn't big enough; Evans replaced the real tree with a 35-foot-high artificial tree with handcrafted artificial leaves and flower blossoms.

In summer 1962, Disneyland produced a weekly live television show for Los Angeles station KTTV called Meet Me at Disneyland, to entice local residents to visit the theme park on weekdays. The new Tahitian Terrace was featured in the sixth episode, "Tahitian Terrace Show", which aired on July 14, 1962. The episode included a demonstration of Polynesian dances by the Royal Tahitians, and an appearance by Mouseketeer Annette Funicello.

In 1972, a new show was performed at the Tahitian Terrace by the Kau'i-Pono dance company, who also performed at the Polynesian Village Resort at Walt Disney World.

The restaurant closed on April 17, 1993. It reopened three months later with a new theme based on the 1992 hit movie Aladdin. Redubbed Aladdin's Oasis Dinner Show, the waterfalls and rockwork of the performing area were replaced with a replica of the huge fanged mouth that forms the entrance of the movie's Cave of Wonders. The new dinner theater could accommodate up to eight shows a day. In early 1997, the dinner show was replaced by a stage show named Aladdin & Jasmine's Story-Tale Adventures and the area was renamed simply Aladdin's Oasis. This stage show closed in April 2008 and was replaced by Secrets of the Stone Tiger, which promoted Indiana Jones and the Kingdom of the Crystal Skull. After that promotion ended in late 2008, the stage and dining area were closed off and characters from Aladdin would meet guests. In 2014, the restaurant and seating portion of Aladdin's Oasis re-opened for On the Go dining packages for Fantasmic!, in 2015 for Paint the Night, and in 2016 for the Main Street Electrical Parade. Characters from Aladdin stopped meeting guests in 2016, when Moana began meeting guests until Aladdin's Oasis closed on May 16, 2018.  

In December 2018, Aladdin's Oasis was replaced by a new Polynesian themed food counter, named Tropical Hideaway.

References

Further reading
 Eat Like Walt: The Wonderful World of Disney Food by Marcy Carriker Smothers, Disney Editions (2017)

Restaurants at Disneyland
Adventureland (Disney)